Pariisin Kevät (meaning Paris Spring in Finnish) is a Finnish indie-pop, indie-rock and electronic band from Helsinki, founded by Arto Tuunela in 2007. Pariisin Kevät began as a solo project and remained so for the first two studio albums. For the tour following the release of Astronautti, a live band was formed which also recorded the third studio album, Kaikki on satua. 

Arto Tuunela previously founded the Finnish alternative group Major Label. Pariisin Kevät is signed to Sony BMG.

Members
Arto Tuunela – lead vocals (previously of the band Major Label)
Antti Pouta – guitar, keyboards, backing vocals
Artturi Taira – guitar, keyboards, backing vocals (from Rubik)
Ilari Kivelä – keyboards, backing vocals
Jussi Hietala – bass guitar
Reko Aho – drums

Discography

Albums

EPs
2007: "Kattojen yllä" (made available online)

Singles

Promotional non-charting singles
2007: "Samoilla raiteilla"
2008: "Meteoriitti"
2008: "Mä haluun sua enemmän ku muut haluu" (with Katri Ylander & Superjanne)
2009: "Joulujoulumaa"
2010: "Invisible Man"
2010: "Matkalla etelään"

Videography
"Samoilla raiteilla"
"Pikku Huopalahti"
"Invisible Man"
"Matkalla etelään"
"Painovoimaa"
"Imatrankoski"
"Saari"
"Kesäyö"
"Kevät"
"Odotus"

References

External links
Official website

Finnish electronic music groups
Finnish indie rock groups
Finnish indie pop groups
Musical groups established in 2007
Musical groups from Helsinki